Frederick William Muller (December 21, 1907 – October 20, 1976) was an infielder in Major League Baseball. He was born in Newark, California, son of German immigrants George and Mary Muller.

Muller was a utility player who played for the Boston Red Sox in parts of two seasons. Used as a backup second baseman for Johnny Hodapp and Bill Cissell, Muller hit a .184 batting average (9-for-49) with seven runs and three RBI in 17 games, including one double, one triple, and one stolen base with no home runs.

Upon retiring, Muller moved to Davis, California and became a farmer. He died there at the age of 68.

See also
1933 Boston Red Sox season
1934 Boston Red Sox season

References

External links

Retrosheet

Boston Red Sox players
Major League Baseball second basemen
Baseball players from California
People from Newark, California
American people of German descent
1907 births
1976 deaths